John Steven Hale (born August 5, 1953) is a former outfielder in Major League Baseball. He played from - for the Los Angeles Dodgers and Seattle Mariners.

External links
, or Retrosheet
Pura Pelota (Venezuelan Winter League)

1953 births
Living people
Águilas del Zulia players
Albuquerque Dukes players
Bakersfield Dodgers players
Baseball players from California
Daytona Beach Dodgers players
Denver Bears players
Indianapolis Indians players
Los Angeles Dodgers players
Major League Baseball outfielders
Navegantes del Magallanes players
American expatriate baseball players in Venezuela
Ogden Dodgers players
Rochester Red Wings players
Seattle Mariners players
Sportspeople from Fresno, California
Waterbury Dodgers players